Reinoso de Cerrato is a municipality located in the province of Palencia, Castile and León, Spain. According to the 2004 census (INE), the municipality had a population of 69 inhabitants.

References

Municipalities in the Province of Palencia